The Government of Pakistan (abbreviated as GoP) constitutionally known as the Federal Government, commonly known as the Centre is the national government of the Islamic Republic of Pakistan, a federal parliamentary democratic republic consisting of four provinces, two autonomous territories, and one federal territory. Under the Constitution, there are three primary branches of a government: the legislative, whose powers are vested in a bicameral Parliament; the executive, consisting of the President, aided by the Cabinet which is headed by the Prime Minister; and the judiciary, with the Supreme Court.

Effecting the Westminster system for governing the state, the government is mainly composed of the executive, legislative, and judicial branches, in which all powers are vested by the Constitution in the Parliament, the Prime Minister and the Supreme Court. The powers and duties of these branches are further defined by acts and amendments of the Parliament, including the creation of executive institutions, departments and courts inferior to the Supreme Court. By constitutional powers, the President promulgates ordinances and passes bills.

The President acts as the ceremonial figurehead while the people-elected Prime Minister acts as the Chief Executive (of the executive branch) and is responsible for running the federal government. There is a bicameral Parliament with the National Assembly as a Lower house and the Senate as an upper house. The most influential officials in the Government of Pakistan are considered to be the Federal Secretaries, who are the highest ranking bureaucrats in the country and run cabinet-level ministries and divisions. The judicial branch systematically contains an apex Supreme Court, Federal Shariat Court, High courts of five provinces, district, anti-terrorism, and the green courts; all inferior to the Supreme Court.

The full name of the country is the Islamic Republic of Pakistan. No other name appears in the Constitution, and this is the name that appears on money, in treaties, and in legal cases. The "Pakistan Government" or "Government of Pakistan" are often used in official documents representing the federal government collectively. Also, the terms "Federal" and "National" in government institutions or program names generally indicate affiliation with the federal government. As the seat of government is in Islamabad, "Islamabad" is commonly used as a metonym for the federal government. On 4 August 2020, the Government released a new political map that maintained the Pakistani claims on Junagadh, Manavadar, and Sir Creek. The map also showed the Islands of Churna and Astola as part of Pakistan for the first time.

Federal law and Constitution
The Constitution of Pakistan established and constituted the federal government of four provinces of federation of nation-state, known as State of Pakistan. The Constitution reads as:

The basic civil and criminal laws governing the citizens of Pakistan are set down in major parliamentary legislation (a term inherited from the United Kingdom), such as the Exit Control List, the Pakistan Penal Code, and the Frontier Crimes Regulations. By the Article 246th and Article 247th to the constitution, the Islamic Jirga (or Panchayat) system has become an institution for local governance. The 1950s reforms in the government administration, the constitutional law and jurisprudence in Pakistan have been greatly influenced by the United States Of America ' legal system. Since the 1970s, the traditional jirga-based law has also been in place in a few areas, and has influenced the country's judicial development.

Branches of government

Legislative branch

The legislative branch has two houses, which combined are known as the Parliament of Pakistan

 The National Assembly is the lower house and has 342 members. 272 are elected directly by the people, while 60 seats are reserved for women and 10 seats for religious minorities.
 The Senate is the upper house and has 104 senators elected indirectly by members of provincial assemblies for six-year terms.

The Parliament enjoys parliamentary supremacy. All the Cabinet ministers as well as the Prime Minister must be members of Parliament (MPs), according to the constitution. The Prime Minister and the Cabinet Ministers are jointly accountable to the Parliament. If there is a policy failure or lapse on the part of the government, all the members of the cabinet are jointly responsible. If a vote of no confidence is passed against the government, then the government collapses and a new one must be formed.

Executive branch
By general definition, the executive branch of government is the one that has sole authority and responsibility for the daily administration of the state bureaucracy. The division of power into separate branches of government is central to the republican idea of the separation of powers. The separation of powers system is designed to distribute authority away from the executive branch – an attempt to preserve individual liberty in response to tyrannical leadership throughout history.

Prime Minister and Cabinet 
The Prime Minister of Pakistan (lit: 'Wazir-e- Azam), is the executive head of government of Pakistan, constitutionally designated as the Chief Executive (CE). Popularly elected by direct elections in the parliament, the Prime minister is responsible for appointing a cabinet as well as running the government operations.

The Prime Minister makes key appointments on various important positions, including;
 The federal secretaries as head of cabinet- level ministries
 The chief secretaries of the provinces
 Key administrative and military personnel in the Pakistan Armed Forces
 The chairmen of large public sector organisations and corporations such as NHA, TCP, PIA, PNSC etc.
 The chairmen and other members of the federal commissions and public institutions
 Ambassadors and High Commissioners to other countries

The Cabinet can have a maximum of 11 percent (50 members including the Prime Minister) of the total strength of the Parliament.
Each Cabinet member must be a member of Parliament (MP). The Cabinet Ministers chair the Cabinet and are further assisted by the Cabinet Secretary of Pakistan, whose appointment comes from the Civil Services of Pakistan. Other Ministers are Ministers of State, junior members who report directly to one of the Cabinet Ministers, often overseeing a specific aspect of government.

Once appointed by the Prime Minister, all Cabinet Ministers are officially confirmed to their appointment offices by the President in a special oath of ceremony.

The President of Pakistan, officially the President of the Islamic Republic of Pakistan, is the ceremonial head of state of Pakistan and the commander-in-chief of the Pakistan Armed Forces.Article 41(1)  in Chapter 1: The President, Part III: The Federation of Pakistan in the Constitution of Pakistan.

The office of president was created upon the proclamation of Islamic Republic on 23 March 1956. The then serving governor-general, Major-General Iskander Mirza, assumed office as the first president. Following the 1958 coup d'etat, the office of prime minister was abolished, leaving the Presidency as the most powerful office in the country. This position was further strengthened when the 1962 Constitution was adopted. It turned Pakistan into a Presidential Republic, giving all executive powers to the president. In 1973, the new Constitution established Parliamentary democracy and reduced president's role to a ceremonial one. Nevertheless, the military takeover in 1977 reversed the changes. The 8th Amendment turned Pakistan into a semi-presidential republic and in the period between 1985 and 2010, the executive power was shared by president and prime minister. The 18th Amendment in 2010 restored Parliamentary Democracy in the country, and reduced presidency to a ceremonial position.

The constitution prohibits the president from directly running the government. Instead, the executive power is exercised on his behalf by the prime minister who keeps him informed on all matters of internal and foreign policy, as well as all legislative proposals. The Constitution however, vests the president with the powers of granting pardons, reprieves, and the control over the military; however, all appointments at higher commands of the military must be made by the President on a "required and necessary" basis, upon consultation and approval from the prime minister.

The president is indirectly elected by the Electoral College for a five-year term. The Constitution requires the president to be a "Muslim of not less than forty five (45) years of age". The president resides in an estate in Islamabad known as Aiwan-e-Sadar (President's House). In his absence, the chairman of Senate exercises the responsibilities of the post, until the actual president resumes office, or the next office holder is elected.

There have been a total of 13 presidents. The first president was Iskander Ali Mirza who entered office on 23 March 1956. The current office holder is Arif Alvi, who took charge on 9 September 2018, following his victory in the 2018 elections.

Judicial branch

Pakistan's independent judicial system began under the British Raj, and its concepts and procedures resemble those of Anglo-Saxon countries. Institutional and judicial procedures were later changed, in 1950s, under the influence of American legal system to remove the fundamental rights problems. The judiciary consists of the Supreme Court of Pakistan, Provincial High Courts, District Courts, Anti-terrorism courts, Sharia courts, and Environmental courts all over the country; Supreme Court being the superior court. The Supreme Court of Pakistan consists of a Chief Justice, and Senior Justices appointed by the President after consultation with the Chief Justice of Pakistan. The Constitution does not fix the number of justices of the Supreme Court, though it can be fixed by Parliament through an act signed by the President.

Judicature transfer
The Constitution grants powers to the Supreme Court to make judicature transfers. Although the proceedings in the Supreme Court arise out of the judgement or orders made by the subordinate courts, the Supreme Court reserves the right to transfer any case, appeal or proceedings pending before any High Court to any other High Court.

Supreme Judicial Council
Misconduct of judges is highly intolerable as is mentioned in the constitution. Under the mainframe of the Supreme Judicial Council Article 209 an inquiry into the capacity or conduct of a Judge, who is a member of the council, may be conducted.

Civil service

The civil service of Pakistan is the permanent bureaucracy of the Government of Pakistan. The civil servants are the permanent officials of the government, occupying a respected image in the civil society. Civil servants come from different cadres (e.g. Pakistan Administrative Service, Police Service of Pakistan etc.) after passing the CSS examinations. Not all the employees of the Government of Pakistan are civil servants; other employees of the Government of Pakistan come from the scientific institutions, state-owned corporations and commissioned military science circles.

In the parliamentary democracy, the ultimate responsibility for running the administration rests with the elected representatives of the people who are the ministers. These ministers are accountable to the legislatures which are also elected by the people on the basis of universal adult suffrage. The cabinet and its ministers are expected to lay down the policy guidelines, and the civil servants are responsible for implementing and enforcing it.

Federal secretaries

The federal secretaries are the most senior, experienced, and capable officials in the country. Each ministry/division has its Secretary to oversee and enforce the public policy matters.

The secretaries, who are basic pay scale (BPS)-22 grade officers, are largely considered to be the most powerful officials in the country. Due to the importance of their respective assignments, there are twelve specific federal secretaries which are considered to be the most vital in the Government of Pakistan. These include the Secretary Establishment (responsible for civil service matters), Secretary Commerce (responsible for trade), Secretary Cabinet (responsible for Cabinet Division), Secretary to the Prime Minister (responsible for Prime Minister's Office), Secretary Interior (responsible for law and order), Secretary Finance (responsible for the country's treasury), Secretary Foreign Affairs (responsible for foreign relations), Secretary Maritime Affairs (responsible for ports and shipping), Secretary Power (responsible for the electricity and power sector), Secretary Planning and Development (responsible for development projects), Secretary Petroleum (responsible for the petroleum sector) and Secretary Industries (responsible for industrial development).

Management of major crisis situations in the country and coordination of activities of the various Ministries in such situations are the functions of the Cabinet Division. Appointment for the chairman of the FPSC, the prestigious body responsible for the recruitment of elite bureaucrats, is made by the President after consulting the Prime Minister, according to Article 242 of the Constitution.

Elections and voting system

Since 1947, Pakistan has an asymmetric federal government, with elected officials at the national (federal), provincial, tribal, and local levels. Constitution has set the limit of government for five years, but if a Vote of no confidence movements takes place in the parliament (and prelude of movements are proved at the Judicial branch), the government falls and immediately replaced with caretaker government initiated by the president (consultation of Prime Minister also required to make such move), in regards to Article 58 of the constitution.

There has been four times that the martial law has been in effect, and controversially approved by the supreme court. Through a general election where the leader of the majority winning party is selected to be the Prime Minister. All members of the federal legislature, the Parliament, are directly elected. Elections in Pakistan take place every five years by universal adult suffrage.

Administration and governments

Provincial and Local governments

There are four provincial governments that rule the four provinces of the state. The Chief Minister heads the provincial government. All provincial assemblies are unicameral, elected for five years. The Governors appointed by President after consulting the Prime minister, act only as representatives of federal government in the province and do not have any part in running the government.

The provincial governments tend to have the greatest influence over most Pakistanis' daily lives. The Local government functions at the basic level. It is the third level of government, consisting Jirga'' in rural tribal areas.

Finances

Taxation and budget

Pakistan has a complex taxation system of more than 70 unique taxes administered by at least 37 tax collection institutions of the Government of Pakistan. Taxation is a debated and controversial issue in public and political science circle of the country, and according to the International Development Committee, Pakistan had a lower-than-average tax take. Only 0.57% of Pakistanis, or 768,000 people out of a population of 190 million pay income tax.

The Finance Minister of Pakistan presents the annual federal budget in the Parliament in the midst of the year, and it has to be passed by both houses of the Parliament. The budget is preceded by an economic survey which outlines the broad direction of the budget and the economic performance of the country for the outgoing financial fiscal year.

National Finance Commission program overview

Constituted under the Article 160 of the Constitution of Pakistan by the Constitution, the National Finance Commission Award (NFC) program is a series of planned economic programs to take control of financial imbalances and equally manage the financial resources for the four provinces to meet their expenditure liabilities while alleviating the horizontal fiscal imbalances.

According to stipulations and directions of the Constitution, the provisional governments and Federal government compete to get higher share of the program's revenues in order to stabilize their own financial status.

Ministries and divisions

Departments

 Abdus Salam Centre for Physics
 Centre for Earthquake Studies
 Academy of Educational Planning and Management
 Pakistan Electric Power Company
 Accountant General Pakistan Revenues
 Airports Security Force
 Aiwan-e-Iqbal
 Alternative Energy Development Board
 Akthar Hameed Khan National Centre for Rural Development
 Animal Quarantine Department
 Anti-Narcotics Force
 Armament Research and Development Establishment
 Associated Press of Pakistan
 Attorney-General for Pakistan
 Auditor General of Pakistan
 Board of Investment
 Bureau of Emigration and Overseas Employment
 Cabinet Committee on National Security
 Capital Development Authority
 Central Board of Film Censors
 Central Power Purchasing Agency 
 Chief Commissionerate for Afghan Refugees
 Civil Aviation Authority
 College of Physicians and Surgeons Pakistan
 Controller General of Accounts
 Competition Commission of Pakistan
 Construction Technology Training Institute 
 Council for Work and Housing Research
 Council of Common Interests
 Council of Islamic Ideology
 Defence Export Promotion Organization
 Defence Science and Technology Organisation
 Department of Archeology and Museums 
 Department of Communications Security 
 Department of Plant Protection
 Department of Stationery and Forms 
 Directorate General of Civil Defence
 Civil Defence Academy
 National Institute of Fire Technology
 Directorate General of Defence Purchase
 Directorate General of Immigration and Passports
 Directorate General of Munitions Production
 Directorate General of Special Education and Social Welfare
 Directorate General of Trade Organisations 
 Directorate of Electronic Media and Publication
 Directorate of Workers Education
 Drug Regulatory Authority of Pakistan
 Earthquake Reconstruction and Rehabilitation Authority
 Economic Coordination Committee
 Election Commission of Pakistan
 Employees Old-Age Benefits Institution 
 ENAR Petrotech Services 
 Engineering Development Board
 Estate Office 
 Export Development Fund 
 Export–Import Bank of Pakistan
 Export Processing Zone Authority 
 Evacuee Trust Property Board
 Pakistan Sikh Gurdwara Prabandhak Committee
 Federal Board of Intermediate and Secondary Education
 Federal Board of Revenue
 Directorate General of Intelligence and Investigation
 Federal Directorate of Education
 Federal Employees Benevolent and Group Insurance Fund
 Federal Flood Commission
 Federal Government Employees Housing Foundation
 Federal Investigation Agency
 National Response Centre for Cyber Crime
 Federal Land Commission
 Federal Ombudsman of Pakistan 
 Federal Public Service Commission
 Civil Services Academy
 Federal Judicial Academy
 Financial Monitoring Unit
 Fisheries Development Board
 Foreign Service of Pakistan
 Foreign Service Academy
 Civil Armed Forces
 Frontier Constabulary
 Frontier Corps
 Frontier Corps
 Frontier Corps
 Frontier Corps
 Gilgit-Baltistan Scouts
 Pakistan Coast Guards
 Punjab Rangers
 Sindh Rangers
 Gazette of Pakistan
 Geological Survey of Pakistan
 Global Change Impact Studies Centre
 Government Holdings Private Limited 
 Government Shipping Office
 Gwadar Port Authority
 Heavy Electrical Complex 
 Heavy Industries Taxila
 Higher Education Commission of Pakistan
 Human Organ Transplant Authority
 Hydrocarbon Development Institute of Pakistan 
 Ignite National Technology Fund
 Institute of Bankers Pakistan
 Indus River System Authority
 Institute of Regional Studies
 Intellectual Property Organisation of Pakistan
 Institute of Chartered Accountants of Pakistan
 Institute of Cost and Management Accountants of Pakistan
 Institute of Optronics
 Institute of Strategic Studies Islamabad
 Intelligence Bureau
 Inter-Services Intelligence
 Inter-State Gas Systems Limited 
 Iqbal Academy
Islamabad Capital Territory Administration
 Islamabad Police
 Islamabad Traffic Police
 Karachi Shipyard and Engineering Works
 Karachi Port Trust
 Khan Research Laboratories
 Lakhara Coal Development Company 
 Law and Justice Commission of Pakistan
 Livestock and Dairy Development Board
 Management Services Wing 
 Marine Fisheries Department
 Pakistan Maritime Security Agency
 Mercantile Marine Department
 Military Lands and Cantonments Department
 Military Vehicles Research and Development Establishment
 National Academy for Prisons Administration
 National Academy of Performing Arts
 National Accountability Bureau
 National Archives of Pakistan
 National Bioethics Committee 
 National Book Foundation 
 National Command Authority (Pakistan)
 Centre of Excellence for Nuclear Security
 Strategic Plans Division Force
 National Commission for Child Welfare and Development
 National Commission for Government Reforms 
 National Commission for Human Development
 Pakistan Human Development Fund
 National Commission for Human Rights
 National Commission on the Status of Women
 National Counter Terrorism Authority
 National Crises Management Cell
 National Database and Registration Authority
 National Disaster Management Authority
 National Institute of Disaster Management
 National Education Assessment System
 National Education Foundation
 National Electric Power Regulatory Authority
 National Energy Conservation Centre
 National Engineering and Scientific Commission
 Air Weapons Complex
 National Development Complex
 National Engineering Services Pakistan
 National Fertilizer Corporation 
 National Fertilizer Marketing Limited 
 National Forensic Science Agency
 National Highway Authority
 National Highways and Motorway Police
 National Industrial Parks Development and Management Company 
 National Industrial Relations Commission
 National Information Technology Board
 National Institute of Electronics
 National Institute of Folk and Traditional Heritage
 National Institute of Health
 National Institute of Oceanography
 Pakistan Antarctic Programme
 National Institute of Population Studies
 National Institute of Science and Technical Education
 National Insurance Company 
 National Intelligence Directorate
 National Language Promotion Department
 National Library of Pakistan
 National Logistics Cell
 National Museum of Pakistan
 National Police Academy
 National Police Bureau
 National Productivity Organization
 National Radio Telecommunications Corporation 
 National School of Public Policy
 National Security Council
 National Telecommunication Corporation
 National Textile University
 National Tariff Commission
 National Training Bureau
 National Transmission and Despatch Company
 National Transport Research Centre
 National University of Sciences and Technology
 National Veterinary Lab
 National Vocational and Technical Training Commission
 Oil and Gas Development Company
 Oil and Gas Regulatory Authority
 Overseas Employment Corporation 
 Overseas Pakistanis Foundation
 Pakistan Academy for Rural Development 
 Pakistan Academy of Letters
 Pakistan Aeronautical Complex
 Pakistan Agricultural Research Council
 National Agricultural Research Centre
 Pakistan Agricultural Storage and Services Corporation
 Pak-Arab Refinery Company
 Pakistan Armed Forces
 Inter-Services Public Relations
 Inter Services Selection Board
 National Defence University
 Institute for Strategic Studies, Research and Analysis
 Pakistan Air Force
 Air Intelligence
 Pakistan Air Force Academy
 Pakistan Army
 National Guard
 Janbaz Force
 Mujahid Force
 Defence Housing Authority
 Frontier Works Organisation
 Military Intelligence
 Pakistan Military Academy
 Pakistan Navy
 Naval Intelligence
 Pakistan Marines
 Pakistan Naval Academy
 Pakistan Atomic Energy Commission
 CHASNUPP Centre for Nuclear Training
 KANUPP Institute of Nuclear Power Engineering
 National Institute for Biotechnology and Genetic Engineering
 Nuclear Institute for Agriculture and Biology
 Nuclear Institute for Food and Agriculture
 Pakistan Institute of Nuclear Science and Technology
 Pakistan Bait-ul-Mal
 Pakistan Bar Council
 Pakistan Broadcasting Corporation
 Pakistan Bureau of Statistics
 Pakistan Coast Guards
 Pakistan Commissioner for Indus Waters
 Pakistan Cotton Standards Institute 
 Pakistan Council for Architects and Town Planners
 Pakistan Council for Renewable Energy Technologies
 Pakistan Council for Research in Water Resources
 Pakistan Council for Science and Technology
 National Commission for Science and Technology
 Pakistan Council of Scientific and Industrial Research
 Pakistan Cricket Board
 Pakistan Customs
 Pakistan Electronic Media Regulatory Authority
 Pakistan Engineering Company 
 Pakistan Engineering Council
 Pakistan Environmental Protection Agency
 Pakistan Gems and Jewellery Development Company
 Pakistan Horticulture Development and Export Company
 Pakistan Hunting and Sporting Arms Development Company
 Pakistan Industrial Development Corporation
 Pakistan Industrial Technical Assistance Centre
 Pakistan Infrastructure Bank
 Pakistan Institute for Parliamentary Services
 Pakistan Institute of Fashion and Design
 Pakistan Institute of Management
 Pakistan Institute of Medical Sciences
 Pakistan Institute of Public Finance Accountants
 Pakistan Institute of Trade and Development
 Pakistan International Airlines Corporation
 Pakistan LNG Limited 
 Pakistan LNG Terminals Limited 
 Pakistan Machine Tool Factory 
 Pakistan Manpower Institute
 Pakistan Marine Academy
 Pakistan Medical and Dental Council
 Pakistan Health Research Council
 Pakistan Meteorological Department
 National Agromet Centre 
 Pakistan Mineral Development Corporation
 Pakistan National Accreditation Council
 Pakistan National Commission for UNESCO 
 Pakistan National Council of the Arts
 Pakistan National Shipping Corporation
 Pakistan Nuclear Regulatory Authority
 Pakistan Nursing Council
 Pakistan Oilseed Development Board
 Pakistan Ordnance Factories
 Pakistan Petroleum
 Pakistan Post
 Pakistan Public Works Department
 Pakistan Railways
 Pakistan Railways Academy
 Pakistan Reinsurance Company Limited
 Pakistan Science Foundation
 Pakistan Museum of Natural History
 Pakistan Scientific and Technological Information Centre
 Pakistan Software Export Board
 Pakistan Sports Board
 Pakistan Standards and Quality Control Authority
 Pakistan State Oil
 Pakistan Steel Mills
 Pakistan Stone Development Company 
 Pakistan Telecommunication Authority
 Pakistan Telecommunication Company Limited
 Pakistan Television Corporation
 PTV Academy
 Pakistan Tourism Development Corporation
 Pakistan Veterinary Medical Council
 PHA Foundation
 Pharmacy Council of Pakistan
 Planning Commission of Pakistan
 National Fertilizer Development Centre
 Pakistan Institute of Development Economics
 Pakistan Planning and Management Institute
 Port Qasim Authority
 Power Information Technology Company 
 Press Council of Pakistan
 Printing Corporation of Pakistan
 Private Educational Institution Regulatory Authority 
 Private Power and Infrastructure Board
 Public Private Partnership Authority 
 Public Procurement Regulatory Authority
 Quaid-e-Azam Academy
 Quaid-e-Azam Mazar Management Board 
 Ruet-e-Hilal Committee
 Saindak Metals Limited 
 Secretariat Training Institute 
 Securities and Exchange Commission of Pakistan
 Small and Medium Enterprise Development Authority
 Space and Upper Atmosphere Research Commission of Pakistan
 Institute of Space and Planetary Astrophysics
 KU Observatory
 Institute of Space Technology
 Pakistan Mission Control Centre
 Satellite Ground Station
 Sonmiani Spaceport
 Tilla Satellite Launch Centre
 Special Communications Organization
 Staff Welfare Organization 
 State Bank of Pakistan
 National Institute of Banking and Finance
 Pakistan Mint
 State Life Insurance Corporation of Pakistan
 Strategic Export Control Division 
 Sui Northern Gas Pipelines Limited
 Sui Southern Gas Company
 Survey of Pakistan
 Technology Upgradation and Skill Development Company 
 Textile Commissioner's Organization 
 Trade Development Authority of Pakistan
 Trade Dispute Resolution Organization
 Trading Corporation of Pakistan
 Utility Stores Corporation
 Virtual University of Pakistan
 Wah Metallurgical Laboratory
 Water and Power Development Authority
 Workers Welfare Fund 
 Zarai Taraqiati Bank Limited
 Zoological Survey Department

See also

 Corruption in Pakistan
 Economic Coordination Committee
 Federal Bureau of Statistics of the Government of Pakistan
 Gazette of Pakistan
 Grade 22
 List of provincial governments of Pakistan
 Ministry of Finance of the Government of Pakistan
 Pakistan Institute of International Affairs
 Statistics Division (Pakistan)
 Types of Government Servants in Pakistan

References

External links
 

YouTube channel
 The President of Pakistan
 Senate of Pakistan
 National Assembly of Pakistan
 Federal Shariat Court of Pakistan
 Supreme Court of Pakistan (archived 14 August 2013)
 List of E-Services provided by Government of Pakistan (archived 18 November 2012)

 
Asian governments